Lewis James Hunt (born 25 August 1982 in Birmingham, West Midlands) is an English footballer who last played for Sutton United.

Career
Hunt's versatility was a big bonus to Southend United when he joined the club from Derby County, making an initial loan deal permanent in the summer of 2004. He featured 11 times for the Rams, but the chance of regular first team football convinced him to join the Blues.

Hunt was released by Southend United at the end of the 2007–08 season.

He subsequently signed a two-year deal with Wycombe Wanderers on 23 July 2008. After missing the first two months of the season with an injury, Hunt scored his first goal for Wycombe on 15 November in a 1–0 home win against future club Bradford City.
 
On 30 July 2010, Hunt signed a one-year deal with Bradford City, reuniting himself with manager Peter Taylor after a two-week trial. He scored his first and only goal for the club in a 2–1 win over Rotherham United.

On 9 May 2011, Bradford City confirmed that Hunt would remain at the club for the forthcoming season. However, his contract was cancelled by mutual consent on 25 October 2011.

He signed for Isthmian League Premier Division club Hendon in early January 2012, but moved a month later to Sutton United of the Conference South.

References

External links

1982 births
Footballers from Birmingham, West Midlands
Living people
Association football defenders
Association football midfielders
English footballers
Derby County F.C. players
Southend United F.C. players
Wycombe Wanderers F.C. players
Bradford City A.F.C. players
Hendon F.C. players
Sutton United F.C. players
English Football League players